Mavedyn Vamhajryn (also known as Mavedyn Vamhajryn Camp (also Romanized as Ārdūgāh Mʿāūdīn Vamhājrīn) is a camp and village in Silakhor-e Sharqi Rural District, in the Central District of Azna County, Lorestan Province, Iran. At the 2006 census, its population was 883, in 186 families.

References 

Towns and villages in Azna County